Javanmard-e-Ghassab Metro Station is a station in Tehran Metro Line 1. It is located in Shahid Dastvareh Boulevard. It is between Shahr-e-Rey Metro Station and Ali Abad Metro Station.

References

Tehran Metro stations